Gardinia anopla is a moth of the family Erebidae. It was described by Hering in 1925. It is found in Arizona.

Adults have been recorded on wing from July to August.

References

 Natural History Museum Lepidoptera generic names catalog

Lithosiina
Moths described in 1925